Geoffrey David Skelton (1916–1998) was a British author and translator. He specialized in German music, writing biographies of Richard Wagner, Cosima Wagner, Wieland Wagner and Paul Hindemith. He also translated numerous plays by leading German-language writers such as Bertolt Brecht, Max Frisch and Peter Weiss.

He won the Schlegel-Tieck Prize twice, the first one for his translation of Robert Lucas' biography of Frieda Lawrence and the second one for Siegfried Lenz's novel The Training Ground.

Translations
 Frieda Lawrence by Robert Lucas
 Cosima Wagner's Diaries: A New Selection by Cosima Wagner
 Man in the Holocene by Max Frisch
 Sketchbook 1966–1971 by Max Frisch
 Selected Letters of Paul Hindemith by Paul Hindemith
 Bluebeard: A Tale by Max Frisch
 The Training Ground by Siegfried Lenz
 As You Were: A Farce by Johann Nestroy
 Arden Must Die, opera libretto by Erich Fried

Co-translations
 Marat/Sade by Peter Weiss (co-translators: Gill Lamden, Geoffrey Skelton and Adrian Mitchell)
 Collected Plays: "St Joan", "Mother", "Lindbergh's Flight", "Baden-Baden", "He Said Yes", "Decision", "Exception" by Bertolt Brecht (co-translators: John Willett, Ralph Manheim and Geoffrey Skelton)
 Three Plays: "Fire Raisers", "Andorra", "Triptych" by Max Frisch (co-translators: Michael Peter Loeffler, Geoffrey Skelton and Michael Bullock)
 Die Walküre (The Valkyrie) (English National Opera Guide 21) by Richard Wagner (co-translators: Geoffrey Skelton, Barry Millington and George Gillespie)
 Cosima Wagner's Diaries, Vol. 2: 1878–1883 by Cosima Wagner (co-translators: Martin Gregor-Dellin, Dietrich Mack and Geoffrey Skelton)
 Living for Brecht: The Memoirs of Ruth Berlau by Ruth Berlau (co-translators: Hans Bunge and Geoffrey Skelton)
  by Peter Weiss (co-translators: Geoffrey Skelton and Adrian Mitchell)

Books
 Wieland Wagner. The Positive Sceptic (Gollancz, 1971)
 Paul Hindemith: The Man Behind the Music (Gollancz, 1975)
 Wagner at Bayreuth: Experiment and Tradition (Barrie & Rockcliffe, 1965; revised ed. 1976)
 Richard and Cosima Wagner: Biography of a Marriage (Gollancz, 1982)
 Wagner in Thought and Practice (Lime Tree, 1991)

References

British biographers
German–English translators
1916 births
1998 deaths
20th-century British translators
20th-century biographers
Wagner scholars